This is a list of Buddhist temples, monasteries, stupas, and pagodas in the Tibet Autonomous Region for which there are Wikipedia articles.

Chokorgyel Monastery
Dorje Drak
Drepung Monastery
Drongtse Monastery
Dzogchen Monastery
Ganden Monastery
Jokhang Monastery 
Kathok
Khorzhak Monastery
Menri Monastery
Mindrolling Monastery
Nechung
Palpung Monastery
Palyul
Ralung Monastery
Sakya Monastery
Samding Monastery
Samye
Sera Monastery
Shechen Monastery
Simbiling Monastery
Surmang Monastery
Tashi Lhunpo Monastery
Tsi Nesar
Tsurphu Monastery
Yerpa

See also
 List of Buddhist temples
 List of Buddhist temples in the People's Republic of China
 Tibetan architecture
 Tibetan Buddhism

Notes

External links

 BuddhaNet's Comprehensive Directory of Buddhist Temples sorted by country
 Buddhactivity Dharma Centres database

 
 
Tibet
Buddhist temples